Adenostemma is a genus of flowering plant in the family Asteraceae described as a genus in 1775. It is widespread in tropical regions of Asia, Africa, Australia, the Americas, and various oceanic islands.

Species

, Plants of the World online has 23 accepted species:

Selected synonyms include:
 Adenostemma angustifolium  — synonym of Adenostemma lavenia var. angustifolium 
 Adenostemma berteroi  — synonym of Adenostemma brasilianum 

A. harlingii and A. zakii are examples of species endemic to Ecuador.

References

 
Asteraceae genera
Taxonomy articles created by Polbot